Disgusting is the debut studio album by American hardcore punk band Beartooth. It was released on June 10, 2014, through Red Bull Records and UNFD Records. The single "Beaten In Lips" was released on May 13, 2014, along with the pre-order for the album.

Background
This album was released a year after the band's debut EP Sick was released. Before the announcement, the band toured with metalcore band Of Mice & Men in the UK, and also played a headline show in London on April 17, 2014. The album was announced by the band a month prior to its release on May 13 and stated that the album would be released on June 10 through Red Bull Records. The recording process, according to Shomo, was very smooth since he has a studio in his house, and would write songs whenever he was bored or couldn't sleep in the middle of the night.

Composition
In an interview with the lead singer, Shomo, he explained that the album was written to "...get my head on straight. I’m not trying to write songs to change the world," and went on to say that "This band is just me being honest with myself. I put in a whole lot of effort and time and more honesty and emotion than I’ve ever put into a record. I’m super-excited for people to hear that and for people to understand where I’ve been in the last year." He also continued to say that he was writing these lyrics while he was in a miserable state during his time with his former band Attack Attack! and that Beartooth was his means of escapism and therapy. The title of the album was also encouraged by how he felt when he wrote the record, stating he was in a "dark place".

The lyrics themselves seek to convey strong messages: "Beaten in Lips" for example tackles the topic of child abuse, encouraging victims to “keep living loud and proud”, while "Relapsing" deals with alcoholism, an issue Shomo has publicly commented on before.

"I Have a Problem" also references alcoholism. However, during an interview on Silverstein vocalist Shane Told's podcast "Lead Singer Syndrome", Shomo stated that the track is mostly about him quitting Attack Attack!.
Shomo then went on to say that he wrote the song the day before his departure from the band and that it was the second Beartooth song he had ever written.

Release and promotion
The first new track to be heard from the album was 'Dead' on April 30 as it was released with a live music video. As the band announced the album on May 13, the band also released a music video for the album's first official single 'Beaten In Lips', which was also released on that day, along with the album made available for pre-orders. The single was featured in an article by Altpress titled '2 Songs You Need To Hear Before May 2014 Ends', promoting the band and the album. After the announcement, they started to stream each individual song on YouTube in order to promote the album's final release, with the entire album available by June 9, a day before the album's release.

 RollingStone issued out an online article titled '10 New Artists You Need to Know: June 2014', of which Beartooth where mentioned with a statement saying; "Their debut full-length, Disgusting, follows a 2013 EP, Sick, and tours with August Burns Red and The Word Alive, and captures Shomo's knack for incisive, depressive lyrics with matchstick-thin silver linings." The final video released from the album was for the song "Body Bag" in celebration for 2015. On December 2, 2015 the album was officially released in Japan and included three new bonus tracks, including a live cover of Ramones song Blitzkrieg Bop. On December 25, the band released a deluxe edition containing the Japanese bonus tracks and an alternate version of "The Lines" labeled as "Low Gain Mix". The band released another b-side called "Sick of It All" for free as part of the Red Bull: 20 before 16. Many have cited the album's significant thrash metal influence, to the point that multiple tracks have been described as punk thrash

Critical reception

The album was met with generally positive response from critics. Scott Heisel from Altpress stated that the band's sound is nothing like Shomo's previous band Attack Attack!; instead of having a metalcore influence, the band appear to have a more hardcore punk influence, which shows on this album, stating it was a mixture of sounds from bands A Day to Remember and Every Time I Die. The album is praised for having double-time passages, straightforward verses and plenty of breakdowns.

Justin Mabee of HM Magazine expressed that the intensity of this album surpasses that from their EP, stating that "...even “I Have a Problem,” with the double kick furious in your ears, is tighter than before.", labeling the album having a mixture of thrash and hardcore music and praising Shomo's ability to create catchy chorus', great guitar riffs and how deep and meaningful the lyrics are. Rocksound reviewer David McLaughlin applauded Shomo's instinctive and not stylised screams and complimented the lyrics, stating that they "...are like bloodstained diary entries." and went on to say that it was Shomo's best work he has ever created so far.

A review on Ultimate Guitar gave the album a 5/10 rating, expressing that "despite it avoiding the overly-chuggy riffs and throwing away the cheesy synths that Attack Attack! used, it still isn't all that different as it sticks to a metalcore formula, although further expressing that it certainly is better in comparison."

Commercial performance
In the United States, the album first entered the Billboard 200 at No. 48, and the Rock Albums chart at No. 19, selling around 8,000 copies in its first week.  The album has sold 63,000 copies in the US as of May 2016. On July 7, 2020 the song "In Between" was certificated gold by RIAA.

Track listing
All songs written and composed by Caleb Shomo except where noted.

I "Finish Line" and "Give It Up" are two of the three known b-sides recorded during the original sessions for Beartooth's debut album Disgusting, the third being "Sick of It All".

Personnel

Beartooth,
 Caleb Shomo – vocals, all instruments

Production
 John Feldmann – A&R, composer, producer (track 4 only)
 Ted Jensen – mastering
 Kenny "Tick" Salcido - A&R
 Caleb Shomo – composer, engineer, mixer, producer (all tracks except track 4)

Additional personnel
 P.R. Brown – photography
 Dave Shapiro – booking agent
 Beckie Sugden – booking agent
 Thomas Gutches – band manager
 Bret Bair – band manager

Charts

Release history

References

2014 debut albums
Beartooth (band) albums
Red Bull Records albums